Guerrillero may refer to: 

A member of a guerrilla group
Guerrillero (newspaper), a Cuban newspaper